The Kokkilai massacre was carried out by the Liberation Tigers of Tamil Eelam.

Incident 
The Kokkilai village massacre is an incident on December 1, 1984, in which LTTE cadres massacred 11 Sinhalese civilians. This attack occurred on the day after the  Kent and Dollar Farm massacres. Most of the victims were Sinhalese fishermen, were shot to death by LTTE cadres.

References and further reading 
 Gunaratna, Rohan. (1998). Sri Lanka's Ethnic Crisis and National Security, Colombo: South Asian Network on Conflict Research. 
 Gunaratna, Rohan. (October 1, 1987). War and Peace in Sri Lanka: With a Post-Accord Report From Jaffna, Sri Lanka: Institute of Fundamental Studies. 
 Gunasekara, S.L. (November 4, 2003). The Wages of Sin, 

1984 crimes in Sri Lanka
Massacres in 1984
Attacks on civilians attributed to the Liberation Tigers of Tamil Eelam
Massacres in Sri Lanka
Liberation Tigers of Tamil Eelam attacks in Eelam War I
Terrorist incidents in Sri Lanka in 1984
December 1984 events in Asia